The Khmer Empire, or the Angkorian Empire, is a term used by historians to refer to Cambodia from the 9th to the 15th centuries, when the nation was a Hindu-Buddhist empire in Southeast Asia. The empire grew out of the former civilizations of Funan and Chenla, which at times ruled over and/or vassalised most of mainland Southeast Asia and parts of Southern China, stretching from the tip of the Indochinese Peninsula northward to the modern Yunnan province of China, and from Vietnam westward to Myanmar. 

Perhaps its most notable legacy is the site of Angkor, now in Cambodia, the Khmer capital during the empire's zenith. The majestic monuments of Angkor, such as Angkor Wat and Bayon, bear testimony to the Khmer Empire's immense power and wealth, impressive art and culture, architectural technique, aesthetic achievements, and the variety of belief systems that it patronised over time. Satellite imaging has revealed that Angkor, during its peak in the 11th to the 13th centuries, was the most extensive pre-industrial urban complex in the world.  Researchers have also concluded that the Khmer Empire invented the world's first healthcare system which included 102 hospitals.

The beginning of the era of the Khmer Empire is conventionally dated to 802, when King Jayavarman II declared himself chakravartin ("universal ruler", a title equivalent to "emperor") in the Phnom Kulen mountains. While the traditional end of the empire is marked with the Siege of Angkor by the Siamese Ayutthaya Kingdom in 1431, the actual reason the Khmer Empire collapsed is still a mystery for scholars. Researchers have determined that a period of strong monsoon rains was succeeded by a drought in the region, which caused damage to infrastructure. Variability between droughts and flooding was also a problem. The collapse of the water system may have caused people to abandon the city of Angkor.

Etymology 
Modern scholars often refer to the empire as the Khmer Empire, or the Angkorian Empire, the latter of which has its name derived from the former capital city of Angkor, located in modern-day Cambodia.

The empire referred to itself as Kambuja (Old Khmer: កម្វុជ) or Kambujadeśa (Old Khmer: កម្វុជទេឝ) which were ancient terms for the modern Kampuchea.

Historiography
The history of Angkor as the central area of settlement of the historical kingdom of Kambujadesa is also the history of the Khmer kingdom from the 9th to the 13th centuries.

From Kambuja itself – and so also from the Angkor region – no written records have survived other than stone inscriptions. Therefore, the current knowledge of the historical Khmer civilisation is derived primarily from:
 Archaeological excavation, reconstruction and investigation
 Stone inscriptions (the most important of which are foundation steles of temples), which report on the political and religious deeds of the kings
 Reliefs in a series of temple walls with depictions of military marches, life in the palace, market scenes, and the daily life of the population
 Reports and chronicles of Chinese diplomats, traders and travellers.

History

Formation and growth

Jayavarman II – the founder of Angkor

According to Sdok Kok Thom inscription, circa 781 Indrapura was the first capital of Jayavarman II, located in Banteay Prey Nokor, near today's Kampong Cham. After he eventually returned to his home, the former kingdom of Chenla, he quickly built up his influence, conquered a series of competing kings, and in 790 became king of a kingdom called Kambuja by the Khmer. He then moved his court northwest to Mahendraparvata, far inland north from the great lake of Tonlé Sap.

Jayavarman II (802–835) is widely regarded as a king who set the foundations of the Angkor period in Cambodian history, beginning with a grandiose consecration ritual that he conducted in 802 on the sacred Mount Mahendraparvata, now known as Phnom Kulen, to celebrate the independence of Kambuja from a place inscriptions call "Java". At that ceremony Prince Jayavarman II was proclaimed a universal monarch (Cambodian: Kamraten jagad ta Raja) or God King (Sanskrit: Deva Raja). or "The Lords of Mountains", hence the concept of Deva Raja or God King was ostensibly imported from Java.

He declared himself Chakravartin in a ritual taken from the Hindu tradition, thereby not only becoming the divinely appointed and therefore uncontested ruler, but also simultaneously declaring the independence of his kingdom from Java. According to some sources, Jayavarman II had resided for some time in Java during the reign of Sailendras, or "The Lords of Mountains", hence the concept of Deva Raja or God King was ostensibly imported from Java. At that time, Sailendras allegedly ruled over Java, Sumatra, the Malay Peninsula and parts of Cambodia, around the Mekong delta.

The first pieces of information on Jayavarman II came from the K.235 stone inscription on a stele in Sdok Kok Thom temple, Isan region, dating to 1053. It recounts two and a half centuries of service that members of the temple's founding family provided for the Khmer court, mainly as chief chaplains of the Shaivite Hindu religion.

Historians debate whether "Java" means the Indonesian island of Java, Champa or a different location.  According to an older established interpretation, Jayavarman II was a prince who lived at the court of Sailendra in Java and brought back to his home the art and culture of the Javanese Sailendran court to Cambodia. This classical theory was revisited by modern scholars such as Claude Jacques and Michael Vickery, who noted that Khmer used the term chvea to describe the Chams, their close neighbours. Moreover, Jayavarman's political career began at Vyadhapura (probably Banteay Prey Nokor) in eastern Cambodia, which makes the scenario of longtime contacts with the Chams (even through skirmishes, as the inscription suggests) more probable than the scenario of a long stay in distant Java. Finally, many early temples on Phnom Kulen show both Cham (e.g. Prasat Damrei Krap) and Javanese influences (e.g. the primitive "temple-mountain" of Aram Rong Cen and Prasat Thmar Dap), even if their asymmetric distribution seems typically Khmer.

In the following years, he extended his territory and, later in his reign, moved from Mahendraparvata and established his new capital of Hariharalaya near the modern Cambodian town of Rolous. He thereby laid the foundation of Angkor, which was to arise some 15 km to the northwest. Jayavarman II died in the year 835 and he was succeeded by his son Jayavarman III. Jayavarman III died in 877 and was succeeded by Indravarman I.

The successors of Jayavarman II continually extended the territory of Kambuja. Indravarman I (reigned 877–889) managed to expand the kingdom without wars and initiated extensive building projects, which were enabled by the wealth gained through trade and agriculture. Foremost were the temple of Preah Ko and irrigation works. Indravarman I developed Hariharalaya further by constructing Bakong circa 881. Bakong in particular bears striking similarity to the Borobudur temple in Java, which strongly suggests that it served as the prototype for Bakong. There must have been exchanges of travelers, if not missions, between the Khmer kingdom and the Sailendras in Java, transmitting to Cambodia not only ideas, but also technical and architectural details.

Yasodharapura – the first city of Angkor

Indravarman I was followed by his son Yasovarman I (reigned 889–915), who established a new capital, Yasodharapura – the first city of Angkor. The city's central temple was built on Phnom Bakheng, a hill which rises around 60 m above the plain on which Angkor sits. Under Yasovarman I the East Baray was also created, a massive water reservoir of 7.1 by 1.7 km.

At the beginning of the 10th century, the kingdom split. Jayavarman IV established a new capital at Koh Ker, some 100 km northeast of Angkor, called Lingapura. Only with Rajendravarman II (reigned 944–968) was the royal palace returned to Yasodharapura. He took up again the extensive building schemes of the earlier kings and established a series of temples in the Angkor area, not the least being the East Mebon, a temple located on an artificial island in the center of the East Baray, and several Buddhist temples, such as Pre Rup, and monasteries. In 950, the first war took place between Kambuja and the kingdom of Champa to the east (in the modern central Vietnam).

The son of Rajendravarman II, Jayavarman V, reigned from 968 to 1001. After he had established himself as the new king over the other princes, his rule was a largely peaceful period, marked by prosperity and a cultural flowering. He established a new capital slightly west of his father's and named it Jayendranagari; its state temple, Ta Keo, was to the south. At the court of Jayavarman V lived philosophers, scholars, and artists. New temples were also established: the most important of these are Banteay Srei, considered one of the most beautiful and artistic of Angkor, and Ta Keo, the first temple of Angkor built completely of sandstone.

A decade of conflict followed the death of Jayavarman V. Three kings reigned simultaneously as antagonists until Suryavarman I (reigned 1006–1050) gained the throne. Suryavarman I established diplomatic relations with the Chola dynasty of south India. Suryavarman I sent a chariot as a present to the Chola Emperor Rajaraja Chola I. His rule was marked by repeated attempts by his opponents to overthrow him and by military conquests. Suryavarman was successful in taking control of the Khmer capital city of Angkor Wat.

At the same time, Angkor Wat came into conflict with the Tambralinga kingdom of the Malay peninsula. In other words, there was a three-way conflict in mainland Southeast Asia. After surviving several invasions from his enemies, Suryavarman requested aid from the powerful Chola Emperor Rajendra Chola I of the Chola dynasty against the Tambralinga kingdom. After learning of Suryavarman's alliance with Rajendra Chola, the Tambralinga kingdom requested aid from the Srivijaya King Sangrama Vijayatungavarman.

This eventually led to the Chola Empire coming into conflict with the Srivijaya Empire. The war ended with a victory for the Chola dynasty and of the Khmer Empire, and major losses for the Srivijaya Empire and the Tambralinga kingdom. This alliance also had religious nuance, since both Chola and Khmer empire were Hindu Shaivite, while Tambralinga and Srivijaya were Mahayana Buddhist. There is some indication that before or after these incidents Suryavarman I sent a gift, a chariot, to Rajendra Chola I to possibly facilitate trade or an alliance.  Suryavarman I's wife was Viralakshmi, and following his death in 1050, he was succeeded by Udayadityavarman II, who built the Baphuon and West Baray.  In 1074, conflict arose between Harshavarman III and the Champa King Harivarman IV.

Golden age of Khmer civilization

Suryavarman II – Angkor Wat

The 12th century was a time of conflict and brutal power struggles. Under Suryavarman II (reigned 1113–1150) the kingdom united internally and the large temple of Angkor was built in a period of 37 years: Angkor Wat, dedicated to the god Vishnu.

In the east, his campaigns against Champa, and Dai Viet, were unsuccessful, though he sacked Vijaya in 1145 and deposed Jaya Indravarman III. The Khmers occupied Vijaya until 1149, when they were driven out by Jaya Harivarman I.  Suryavarman II sent a mission to the Chola dynasty of south India and presented a precious stone to the Chola emperor Kulottunga Chola I in 1114.

Another period followed in which kings reigned briefly and were violently overthrown by their successors. Finally, in 1177 the capital was raided and looted in a naval battle on the Tonlé Sap lake by a Cham fleet under Jaya Indravarman IV, and Tribhuvanadityavarman was killed.

Jayavarman VII – Angkor Thom

King Jayavarman VII (reigned 1181–1219) was generally considered Cambodia's greatest king. He had already been a military leader as a prince under the previous kings. After the Cham had conquered Angkor, he gathered an army and regained the capital. He ascended the throne and continued the war against the neighbouring eastern kingdom for another 22 years, until the Khmer defeated Champa in 1203 and conquered large parts of its territory.  According to Chinese sources, Jayavarman VII added Pegu to the territory of the Khmer Empire in 1195.

Jayavarman VII stands as the last of the great kings of Angkor, not only because of his successful war against the Cham, but also because he was not a tyrannical ruler in the manner of his immediate predecessors. He unified the empire and carried out noteworthy building projects. The new capital, now called Angkor Thom (literally: "Great City"), was built. In the centre, the king (himself a follower of Mahayana Buddhism) had constructed as the state temple the Bayon, with towers bearing faces of the boddhisattva Avalokiteshvara, each several metres high, carved out of stone. Further important temples built under Jayavarman VII were Ta Prohm for his mother, Preah Khan for his father, Banteay Kdei, and Neak Pean, as well as the reservoir of Srah Srang. An extensive network of roads was laid down connecting every town of the empire, with rest-houses built for travelers and a total of 102 hospitals established across his realm.

Jayavarman VIII – the last blooming
After the death of Jayavarman VII, his son Indravarman II (reigned 1219–1243) ascended the throne. Like his father, he was a Buddhist, and he completed a series of temples begun under his father's rule. As a warrior he was less successful. In the year 1220, under mounting pressure from increasingly powerful Đại Việt, and its Cham alliance, the Khmer withdrew from many of the provinces previously conquered from Champa.

Indravarman II was succeeded by Jayavarman VIII (reigned 1243–1295). In contrast to his predecessors, Jayavarman VIII was a follower of Hindu Shaivism and an aggressive opponent of Buddhism, destroying many Buddha statues in the empire and converting Buddhist temples to Hindu temples. From the outside, the empire was threatened in 1283 by the Mongols under Kublai Khan's general Sogetu (sometimes known as Sagatu or Sodu), who was the governor of Guangzhou, China. The king avoided war with his powerful opponent, who ruled all of China, by paying annual tribute, starting in 1285. Jayavarman VIII's rule ended in 1295 when he was deposed by his son-in-law Srindravarman (reigned 1295–1309). The new king was a follower of Theravada Buddhism, a school of Buddhism that had arrived in southeast Asia from Sri Lanka and subsequently spread through most of the region.

In August 1296, the Chinese diplomat Zhou Daguan arrived at Angkor and recorded, "In the recent war with the Siamese, the country was utterly devastated." He remained at the court of King Srindravarman until July 1297. He was neither the first nor the last Chinese representative to visit Kambuja. His stay is notable, however, because Zhou Daguan later wrote a detailed report on life in Angkor. His portrayal is today one of the most important sources of understanding historical Angkor. Alongside descriptions of several great temples (the Bayon, the Baphuon, Angkor Wat) – his account informs us that the towers of the Bayon were once covered in gold – the text also offers valuable information on the everyday life and the habits of the inhabitants of Angkor.

Decline
By the 14th century, the Khmer empire suffered a long, arduous, and steady decline. Historians have proposed different causes for the decline: the religious conversion from Vishnuite-Shivaite Hinduism to Theravada Buddhism that affected social and political systems, incessant internal power struggles among Khmer princes, vassal revolt, foreign invasion, plague, and ecological breakdown.

For social and religious reasons, many aspects contributed to the decline of the Khmer empire. The relationship between the rulers and their elites was unstable – among the 27 Angkorian rulers, eleven lacked a legitimate claim to power, and civil wars were frequent. The Khmer empire focused more on the domestic economy and did not take advantage of the international maritime network. In addition, the input of Buddhist ideas conflicted and disturbed the state order built under the predominant Hinduism.

Conversion of faith

The last Sanskrit inscription is dated 1327 and describes the succession of Indrajayavarman by Jayavarmadiparamesvara. Historians suspect a connection with the kings' adoption of Theravada Buddhism: they were therefore no longer considered "devarajas", and there was no need to erect huge temples to them, or rather to the gods under whose protection they stood. The retreat from the concept of the devaraja may also have led to a loss of royal authority and thereby to a lack of workers. The water-management apparatus also degenerated, meaning that harvests were reduced by floods or drought. While previously three rice harvests per year were possible – a substantial contribution to the prosperity and power of Kambuja – the declining harvests further weakened the empire.

Looking at the archaeological record, however, archaeologists noticed that not only were the structures ceasing to be built, but the Khmer's historical inscription was also lacking from the period of 1300–1600. With this lack of historical content, there is unfortunately very limited archaeological evidence to work with. Archaeologists have been able to determine that the sites were abandoned and then reoccupied later by different people.

Foreign pressure

The Ayutthaya Kingdom arose from a confederation of threecity-states on the Lower Chao Phraya basin (Ayutthaya-Suphanburi-Lopburi). From the fourteenth century on, Ayutthaya became Angkor's rival. Angkor was besieged by the Ayutthayan king Uthong in 1352, and following its capture the next year, the Khmer monarch was replaced with successive Siamese princes.  Then in 1357, the Khmer king Suryavamsa Rajadhiraja regained the throne.  In 1393, the Ayutthayan king Ramesuan besieged Angkor again, capturing it the next year.  Ramesuan's son ruled Khmer a short time before being assassinated. Finally, in 1431, the Khmer king Ponhea Yat abandoned Angkor as indefensible, and moved to the Phnom Penh area.

The new centre of the Khmer kingdom was in the southwest, at Oudong in the region of today's Phnom Penh. However, there are indications that Angkor was not completely abandoned. One line of Khmer kings may have remained there, while a second moved to Phnom Penh to establish a parallel kingdom. The final fall of Angkor would then be due to the transfer of economic – and therewith political – significance, as Phnom Penh became an important trade centre on the Mekong. Besides, severe droughts and ensuing floods were considered one of the contributing factors to its fall. The empire focused more on regional trade after the first drought.

Ecological breakdown

Ecological failure and infrastructural breakdown is a new alternative theory regarding the end of the Khmer Empire. Scientists working on the Greater Angkor Project believe that the Khmers had an elaborate system of reservoirs and canals used for trade, transportation, and irrigation. The canals were used for harvesting rice. As the population grew there was more strain on the water system. During the fourteenth and fifteenth centuries, there were also severe climatic changes impacting the water management system.

Periods of drought led to decreases in agricultural productivity, and violent floods due to monsoons damaged the infrastructure during this vulnerable time. To adapt to the growing population, trees were cut down from the Kulen hills and cleared out for more rice fields. That created rain runoff carrying sediment to the canal network. Any damage to the water system would have enormous consequences.

Plague
The plague theory, which suggests a severe epidemic outbreak might have hit the heavily populated Angkor and contributed to the fall of the empire, has been reconsidered. By the 14th century, the Black Death had affected Asia, as the plague first appeared in China around 1330 and reached Europe around 1345. Most seaports along the line of travel from China to Europe felt the impact of the disease, which might have had a severe impact on life throughout Southeast Asia. Possible diseases include bubonic plague, smallpox and malaria.

Angkor after the 15th century
In any event, there is evidence for a further period of use of Angkor. Under the rule of King Barom Reachea I (reigned 1566–1576), who temporarily succeeded in driving back Ayutthaya, the royal court was briefly returned to Angkor.  Inscriptions from the 17th century testify to Japanese settlements alongside those of the remaining Khmer. The best-known inscription tells of Ukondayu Kazufusa, who celebrated the Khmer New Year there in 1632. However, in following decades the Japanese community was absorbed into the local Khmer community, owing to the lack of new Japanese arrivals and very little possibility of renewing their community.

Culture and society

Much of what is known of the ancient Khmer society comes from the many bas-reliefs and also the first-hand Chinese accounts of Zhou Daguan, which provide information on 13th-century Cambodia and earlier. The bas-reliefs of Angkor temples, such as those in Bayon, describe everyday life of the ancient Khmer kingdom, including scenes of palace life, naval battles on the river or lakes, and common scenes of the marketplace.

Economy and agriculture
The ancient Khmers were a traditional agricultural community, relying heavily on rice farming. The farmers, who formed the majority of the kingdom's population, planted rice near the banks of the lake or river, in the irrigated plains surrounding their villages, or in the hills when the lowlands were flooded. The rice paddies were irrigated by a massive and complex hydraulics system, including networks of canals and barays, or giant water reservoirs. This system enabled the formation of large-scale rice farming communities surrounding Khmer cities. Sugar palm trees, fruit trees, and vegetables were grown in the orchards by the villages, providing other sources of agricultural produce such as palm sugar, palm wine, coconut, various tropical fruits, and vegetables.

Located by the massive Tonlé Sap lake, and also near numerous rivers and ponds, many Khmer people relied on fresh water fisheries for their living. Fishing gave the population their main source of protein, which was turned into prahok – dried or roasted or steamed fish paste wrapped in banana leaves. Rice was the main staple along with fish. Other sources of protein included pigs, cattle, and poultry, which were kept under the farmers' houses, which were on stilts to protect them from flooding.

The marketplace of Angkor contained no permanent buildings; it was an open square where the traders sat on the ground on woven straw mats and sold their wares. There were no tables or chairs. Some traders might be protected from the sun with a simple thatched parasol. A certain type of tax or rent was levied by officials for each space occupied by traders in the marketplace. The trade and economy in the Angkor marketplace were mainly run by women.

Zhou Daguan's description of the women of Angkor:

The role of women in the trade and economy of the Khmer Empire suggests that they enjoyed significant rights and freedom. Their practice of marrying early may have contributed to the high fertility rate and huge population of the kingdom.

Society and politics

The Khmer empire was founded upon extensive networks of agricultural rice farming communities. A distinct settlement hierarchy is present in the region. Small villages were clustered around regional centres, such as the one at Phimai, which in turn sent their goods to large cities like Angkor in return for other goods, such as pottery and foreign trade items from China. The king and his officials were in charge of irrigation management and water distribution, which consisted of an intricate series of hydraulics infrastructure, such as canals, moats, and massive reservoirs called barays.

Society was arranged in a hierarchy reflecting the Hindu caste system, where the commoners – rice farmers and fishermen – formed the large majority of the population.  The kshatriyas – royalty, nobles, warlords, soldiers, and warriors – formed a governing elite and authorities. Other social classes included brahmins (priests), traders, artisans such as carpenters and stonemasons, potters, metalworkers, goldsmiths, and textile weavers, while on the lowest social level were slaves.

The extensive irrigation projects provided rice surpluses that could support a large population. The state religion was Hinduism but influenced by the cult of Devaraja, elevating the Khmer kings as possessing the divine quality of living gods on earth, attributed to the incarnation of Vishnu or Shiva. In politics, this status was viewed as the divine justification of a king's rule. The cult enabled the Khmer kings to embark on massive architectural projects, constructing majestic monuments such as Angkor Wat and Bayon to celebrate the king's divine rule on earth.

The King was surrounded by ministers, state officials, nobles, royalties, palace women, and servants, all protected by guards and troops. The capital city of Angkor and the Khmer royal court are famous for grand ceremonies, with many festivals and rituals held in the city. Even when travelling, the King and his entourages created quite a spectacle, as described in Zhou Daguan's account:

Zhou Daguan's description of a royal procession of Indravarman III:

Zhou Daguan's description of the Khmer king's wardrobe:

Khmer kings were often involved in series of wars and conquests. The large population of Angkor enabled the kingdom to support large free standing armies, which were sometimes deployed to conquer neighbouring princedoms or kingdoms. Series of conquests were led to expand the kingdom's influence over areas surrounding Angkor and Tonle Sap, the Mekong valley and delta, and surrounding lands. Some Khmer kings embarked on military conquests and war against neighbouring Champa, Dai Viet, and Thai warlords. Khmer kings and royal families were also often involved in incessant power struggle over successions or rivalries over principalities.

Military

According to the Chinese traveler Zhou Daguan, who stayed in Yaśodharapura between 1296 and 1297, the Sukhothai Kingdom laid waste to Khmer lands in repeated wars. According to Zhou, the Khmer soldiers fought naked and barefoot, wielding only lance and shield. They did not use bows and arrows (though, in some instances, they used them in naval warfare), trebuchets, body armor, or helmets. When Sukhotai attacked, ordinary people were ordered to face them without strategy or preparation. The Khmer had double bow crossbows mounted on elephants, which Michel JacqHergoualc’h suggests were elements of Cham mercenaries in Jayavarman VII's army.

In terms of fortifications, Zhou described Angkor Thom's walls as being 10 kilometers long in circumference with five gateways, each with two gates, surrounded by a large moat spanned by bridges. The walls, which formed an exact square, were made of stone and so tightly packed that no weeds grew from them. The walls were around 6–7 meters in height and sloped from the inside, thick enough to contain chambers, but with no battlements and only a single stone tower on each of the four sides. Guards operated them, but dogs were not allowed on the walls.  According to an oral tradition told to Henri Mouhot, the Khmer empire had a standing army of 5-6 million soldiers.

Culture and way of life

Zhou Daguan's description of Khmer houses:

Houses of farmers were situated near the rice paddies on the edge of the cities.  The walls of the houses were made of woven bamboo, with thatched roofs, and they were on stilts. A house was divided into three rooms by woven bamboo walls. One was the parents' bedroom, another was the daughters' bedroom, and the largest was the living area. Sons slept wherever they could find space. The kitchen was at the back or in a separate room. Nobles and kings lived in the palace and much larger houses in the city. They were made of the same materials as the farmers' houses, but the roofs were wooden shingles and had elaborate designs as well as more rooms.

The common people wore a sampot where the front end was drawn between the legs and secured at the back by a belt. Nobles and kings wore finer and richer fabrics. Women wore a strip of cloth to cover the chest, while noble women had a lengthened one that went over the shoulder. Men and women wore a Krama. Along with depictions of battle and the military conquests of kings, the basreliefs of Bayon depict the mundane everyday life of common Khmer people, including scenes of the marketplace, fishermen, butchers, people playing a chess-like game, and gambling during cockfighting.

Religion

The main religion was Hinduism, followed by Buddhism in popularity. Initially, the kingdom revered Hinduism as the main state religion. Vishnu and Shiva were the most revered deities, worshipped in Khmer Hindu temples. Temples such as Angkor Wat are actually known as Phitsanulok  (Vara Vishnuloka in Sanskrit) or the realm of Vishnu, to honor the posthumous King Suryavarman II as Vishnu.

Hindu ceremonies and rituals performed by Brahmins (Hindu priests), usually only held among the ruling elites of the king's family, nobles, and the ruling class. The empire's official religions included Hinduism and Mahayana Buddhism until Theravada Buddhism prevailed, even among the lower classes, after its introduction from Sri Lanka in the 13th century.

Art and architecture

Zhou Daguan's description on the Angkor Royal Palace:

The Khmer empire produced numerous temples and majestic monuments to celebrate the divine authority of Khmer kings. Khmer architecture reflects the Hindu belief that the temple was built to recreate the abode of Hindu gods, Mount Meru, with its five peaks and surrounded by seas represented by ponds and moats. The early Khmer temples built in the Angkor region and the Bakong temple in Hariharalaya (Roluos) employed stepped pyramid structures to represent the sacred temple-mountain.

Khmer art and architecture reached their aesthetic and technical peak with the construction of the majestic temple Angkor Wat. Other temples are also constructed in the Angkor region, such as Ta Phrom and Bayon. The construction of the temple demonstrates the artistic and technical achievements of the Khmer Empire through its architectural mastery of stone masonry.

List of architectural styles during Angkor period:

Relations with regional powers

During the formation of the empire, the Khmer had close cultural, political, and trade relations with Java and with the Srivijaya empire that lay beyond Khmer's southern seas. In 851 a Persian merchant named Sulaiman al-Tajir recorded an incident involving a Khmer king and a Maharaja of Zabaj. He described the story of a Khmer king who defied the power of Maharaja of Zabaj. It was said that the Javanese Sailendras staged a surprise attack on the Khmers by approaching the capital from the river. The young king was later punished by the Maharaja, and subsequently the kingdom became a vassal of the Sailendra dynasty.

Zabaj is the Arabic form of Javaka and might refer to Java or Srivijaya. The legend probably describes the predecessor or initial stage of the Khmer kingdom under Javanese dominion. The Legend of the Maharaja of Zabaj was later published by the historian Masoudi in his 947 book, "Meadows of Gold and Mines of Gems." The Kaladi inscription of Java (c. 909 CE) mentioned Kmir (Khmer people or Cambodian) together with Campa (Champa) and Rman (Mon) as foreigners from mainland Southeast Asia who frequently came to Java to trade. The inscription suggests a maritime trade network had been established between Kambuja and Java (Mdang kingdom).

In 916 CE Arab historian Abu Zaid Hasan, recorded in a lengthy chronicle that the young, inexperienced king of Khmer, is hostile to Java. When the hostility becomes state policy and is known publicly, the King of Java attacked and captured the Khmer king. He was beheaded and the head brought to Java. The King of Java ordered the Minister of Khmer Empire to seek the successor. After being cleaned and embalmed, the head of the king was put in a vase and sent to the new Khmer king.

Throughout its history, the empire also was involved in series of wars and rivalries with the neighbouring kingdoms of Champa, Tambralinga, and Đại Việt – and later in its history with Siamese Sukhothai and Ayutthaya. The Khmer Empire's relations with its eastern neighbour Champa was exceptionally intense, as both sides struggled for domination in the region. The Cham fleet raided Angkor in 1177, and in 1203 the Khmer managed to push back and defeat Champa.

Arab writers of the 9th and 10th century hardly mention the region for anything other than its perceived backwardness, but they considered the king of Al-Hind (India and Southeast Asia) one of the four great kings in the world. The ruler of the Rashtrakuta Dynasty is described as the greatest king of Al-Hind, but even the lesser kings of Al-Hind including the kings of Java, Pagan Burma, and the Khmer kings of Cambodia are invariably depicted by the Arabs as extremely powerful and as being equipped with vast armies of men, horses, and often tens of thousands of elephants. They were also known to have been in possession of vast treasures of gold and silver. The Khmer rulers established relations with the Chola dynasty of South India.

The Khmer Empire seems to have maintained contact with Chinese dynasties; spanning from the late Tang period to the Yuan period. The relations with the Yuan dynasty was of great historical significance, since it produced The Customs of Cambodia, an important insight into the Khmer Empire's daily life, culture and society. The report was written between 1296 and 1297 by the Yuan Chinese diplomat Zhou Daguan, sent by Temür Khan of Yuan dynasty to stay in Angkor.

Beginning in the 13th century, Khmer's relations with the Siamese were difficult and bitter, resulting in rivalry and hostility for centuries. In August 1296, Zhou Daguan recorded that in the recent war with the Siamese, the country was utterly devastated. This report confirmed that by the late 13th century, the Siamese warlords had revolted and disrupted the Khmer empire's hegemony, starting Siam's rise. By the 14th century, the Siamese Ayutthaya Kingdom became the Khmer empire's formidable rival, as Angkor was besieged and captured twice by Ayutthayan Siamese invaders in 1353 and 1394.

In the 1300s, the Lao prince Fa Ngum was exiled to lived in the royal court of Angkor.  His father-in-law, the King of Cambodia, gave him a Khmer army to create a buffer state in what is now Laos.  Fa Ngum conqured local principalities and established the Kingdom of Lan Xang.  With the assistance of Khmer scholars, Fa Ngum introduced Theravada Buddhism and the culture of the Khmer Empire to the region.

A Javanese source, the Nagarakretagama canto 15, composed in 1365 in the Majapahit Empire, claimed Java had established diplomatic relations with Kambuja (Cambodia) together with Syangkayodhyapura (Ayutthaya), Dharmmanagari (Negara Sri Dharmaraja), Rajapura (Ratchaburi) and Singhanagari (Songkla), Marutma (Martaban or Mottama, Southern Myanmar), Champa and Yawana (Annam). This record describes the political situations in Mainland Southeast Asia in the mid-14th century; although the Cambodian kingdom still survived, the rise of Siamese Ayutthaya had taken its toll. Finally, the empire fell, marked by the abandonment of Angkor for Phnom Penh in 1431, caused by Siamese pressure.

List of rulers

Gallery of temples

See also
 Post-Angkor Period
 List of kings of Cambodia – Chronological listing with reign, title and posthumous title(s), where known

References

Bibliography
 
 
 
 Vittorio Roveda: Khmer Mythology, River Books, 
 
 
 
 David P. Chandler: A History of Cambodia, Westview Press, 
 
 
 Henri Mouhot: Travels in Siam, Cambodia, Laos, and Annam, White Lotus Co, Ltd., 
 
 Benjamin Walker, Angkor Empire: A History of the Khmer of Cambodia, Signet Press, Calcutta, 1995.
 I.G. Edmonds, The Khmers of Cambodia: The story of a mysterious people
 Jessup, H. I. (2018). The South-East Asia: The Khmer 802-1566. In J. Masselos (Ed.) The Great Empires of Asia (pp.78-106). Thames & Hudson.

External links
 
 

 
Former countries in Cambodian history
Former empires in Asia
States and territories disestablished in 1432
802 establishments
1432 disestablishments in Asia
Historical Hindu empires
Indianized kingdoms
Former countries in Southeast Asia
1st millennium in Cambodia
2nd millennium in Cambodia
Former monarchies of Southeast Asia